Donald E. Davis is an American writer and historian. Previously, Davis was a professor at Illinois State University.

Early life and education
Davis earned his bachelor's degree from San Francisco State University. He attended graduate school at Indiana University, where he obtained his MA and PhD, focusing on Russian history. Davis wrote his dissertation on Vladimir Lenin and theories of warfare, especially those of Clausewitz. At San Francisco State University, Harold H. Fisher mentored him; at Indiana University, he studied with Robert F. Byrnes and Robert H. Ferrell.

Career
Davis edited, No East or West: The Memoirs of Paul B. Anderson. He coauthored The First Cold War: The Legacy of Woodrow Wilson in U.S. - Soviet Relations with Eugene P. Trani, an American diplomatic historian. Additionally, Distorted Mirrors; The Reporter Who Knew Too Much; and A Bridge to Somewhere. In 2004, Davis retired from Illinois State University after 40 years of teaching courses in European, Russian, and Soviet history. He was one of the university’s longest serving faculty members in the history department. He is a member of the American Association for Slavic, East European, and Eurasian Studies (AASEEES) and has published in its journal, the Slavic Review (“The American YMCA and the Russian Revolution” vol. 33, no. 3, pp. 469–91) as well as in many other scholarly journals and anthologies. His personal archive, the “Davis Collection,” is at the Hoover Institution, Stanford University.

Personal life
Davis is married to Mary Davis, a retired elementary school teacher and director of a multi-county rural transport system, SHOW BUS. The couple has two children, a son and daughter.

Bibliography
 No East or West: The Memoirs of Paul B. Anderson (1985)
 The First Cold War: The Legacy of Woodrow Wilson in U.S. - Soviet Relations (2002 - also published in Russian and Chinese editions)
 Distorted Mirrors: Americans and Their Relations with Russia and China in the Twentieth Century (2009 - also published in Russian, Spanish, and Chinese editions)
 The Reporter Who Knew Too Much: Harrison Salisbury and the New York Times (2012)
 A Bridge to Somewhere: The Tragedy of the Messina Strait Bridge Project (2014)

References

20th-century births
Living people
San Francisco State University alumni
Indiana University alumni
Indiana State University faculty
21st-century American historians
American male non-fiction writers
Illinois State University faculty
Place of birth missing (living people)
Year of birth missing (living people)
21st-century American male writers